Petrophile diversifolia is a species of flowering plant in the family Proteaceae and is endemic to southwestern Western Australia. It is a shrub with pinnate, sharply-pointed leaves, and oval heads of densely hairy, white or creamy-white flowers.

Description
Its young leaves are soft, hairy, fern-like and often reddish.

Taxonomy
Petrophile diversifolia was first formally described in 1810 by Robert Brown in the Transactions of the Linnean Society of London. The specific epithet (diversifolia) means "different-leaved", referring to the variably-shaped leaves.

Distribution and habitat
This petrophile grows in sandy scrub, forest and shrubland between the Blackwood River and the Stirling Range as well as near Bremer Bay, in the Esperance Plains, Jarrah Forest, Swan Coastal Plain and Warren biogeographical regions of southwestern Western Australia.

Conservation status
Petrophile diversifolia is classified as "not threatened" by the Western Australian Government Department of Parks and Wildlife.

References

diversifolia
Eudicots of Western Australia
Endemic flora of Western Australia
Plants described in 1810
Taxa named by Robert Brown (botanist, born 1773)